Plešivec is a large village and municipality in the Rožňava District in the Košice Region of middle-eastern Slovakia.

History 
In historical records the village was first mentioned in 1243.

Geography 
The village lies at an altitude of 218 metres and covers an area of 62,142 km².
It has a population of about 2440 people.

Economy and facilities 
The village has a petrol station and a guesthouse. It also has a number of quality medical facilities including a pharmacy, a doctors surgery and outpatient facilities for children and adolescents. The village also has a commercial bank, an insurance company and a cashomat.

Government 
The village has its own birth registry office and its own police force

Culture 
The village has a public library, a gymnasium and a football pitch.

Transport 
The village has its own railway station.

External links 
 http://www.statistics.sk/mosmis/eng/run.html

Villages and municipalities in Rožňava District